Ellis School is a school building in Ashland, Wisconsin which was built in 1900.  It was added to the National Register of Historic Places on July 17, 1980.  It is noted for its architecture—the design of Henry Wildhagen—which is of the 19th- and 20th-century revival styles.

It is a two-story-plus-basement Neoclassical building.  According to a 1979 architectural review, itssimple, rectangular mass is varied only by a projecting center pedimented pavilion, cut by a Neoclassical arch over the entrance. The brownstone voussoirs and keystone of the arch and the basement story contrasted with the brick walls relate to the materials of the other schools. Although the grand arch and triple-window motif is again used to mark the story over the entrance, the omission of overt Richardsonian Romanesque references make the Ellis School unique among its fellows. Distribution of double-hung windows to either side of the center pavilion is regular, with four to each side. An elliptical window is set into the center pediment which intersects the low pyramidal roof.

Wildhagen also designed three other schools in Ashland, also NRHP-listed:  Ashland Middle School (1904), Beaser School (1899), and Wilmarth School (1895).

Notes

References 
 

Buildings and structures in Ashland County, Wisconsin
School buildings on the National Register of Historic Places in Wisconsin
School buildings completed in 1895
National Register of Historic Places in Ashland County, Wisconsin
Ashland, Wisconsin
School buildings completed in 1900
1900 establishments in Wisconsin